Family Secrets is a 1984 American made-for-television drama film starring Maureen Stapleton, Melissa Gilbert and Stefanie Powers (who also co-wrote and co-produced). The TV film was directed by Jack Hofsiss.

Synopsis
Three generations of female family members spend time together over an emotional weekend.

Cast
 Melissa Gilbert as Sara Calloway
 Stefanie Powers as Jessie Calloway
 Marion Ramsey as Linda Jones
 Kimmy Robertson as Mickey
 Gary Sinise as Motorcyclist
 James Spader as Lowell Everall
 Maureen Stapleton as Maggie Lukauer
 Irene Tedrow as Mrs. Fenwick

Release
The film was broadcast on NBC May 13, 1984.

Home media
The film was released on VHS on January 1, 1987.

Production
The working title of the film was Mother's Day.

References

External links

1984 television films
1984 films
1984 drama films
Films scored by Charles Fox
NBC network original films
American drama television films
1980s American films
1980s English-language films
English-language drama films